The Boeing C-97 Stratofreighter was a long-range heavy military cargo aircraft developed from the B-29 and B-50 bombers. Design work began in 1942, the first of three prototype XC-97s flew on 9 November 1944 (none saw combat), and the first of six service-test YC-97s flew on 11 March 1947. All nine were based on the 24ST alloy structure and Wright R-3350 engines of the B-29, but with a larger-diameter fuselage upper lobe (making a figure of eight or "double-bubble" section) and they had the B-29 vertical tail with the gunner's position blanked off. The first of three heavily revised YC-97A incorporating the re-engineered wing (higher-strength 75ST alloy), taller vertical tail and larger Pratt & Whitney R-4360 engines of the B-50 bomber, flew on 28 January 1948 and was the basis of the subsequent sole YC-97B, all production C-97s, KC-97s and civilian Stratocruiser aircraft. Between 1944 and 1958, 888 C-97s in several versions were built, 811 being KC-97 tankers. C-97s served in the Berlin Airlift, the Korean War, and the Vietnam War. Some aircraft served as flying command posts for the Strategic Air Command, while others were modified for use in Aerospace Rescue and Recovery Squadrons (ARRS).

Design and development
The C-97 Stratofreighter was developed towards the end of World War II by fitting a second lobe on top of the fuselage and wings of the B-29 Superfortress with the tail, wing, and engine layout being nearly identical. The XC-97 and YC-97 can be distinguished from the Boeing 377 Stratocruiser and later C-97s by the shorter fin, and later ones by the flying boom and jet engines on the tanker models.

The prototype XC-97 was powered by the same  Wright R-3350 engines as used in the B-29. The XC-97 took off for its first flight on November 9, 1944, just after the death of Boeing president Philip G. Johnson.

The tenth and all subsequent aircraft were fitted with the  Pratt & Whitney Wasp Major engines and taller fin and rudder of the B-50 Superfortress.

The C-97 had clamshell doors under its tail, so that two retractable ramps could be used to drive in cargo but was not a combat transport able to deliver to primitive forward bases. The doors could not be opened in flight, but could be removed to carry out air drops. The C-97 featured cabin pressurization, which made long flights more comfortable.

The C-97 was developed into the civilian Boeing 377 Stratocruiser, a transoceanic airliner that could be fitted with sleeper cabins and featured a lower deck lounge. The first Stratocruiser flew on July 8, 1947. Only 56 were built.

Operational history 
The C-97 entered service in 1947, during a period of rapid development of heavy transport aircraft. Only 77 were built before the Douglas C-124 Globemaster II was delivered in 1950, with nearly twice the payload capacity of the C-97. The USAF Strategic Air Command operated C-97 Stratofreighters from 1949 to 1978. Early in its service life, it served as an airborne alternative SAC command post. While only 77 C-97 transports were built, 811 were built as KC-97 Stratofreighters for inflight refueling. The KC-97 began to be phased out with the introduction of the Boeing KC-135 Stratotanker in 1957.  Many KC-97s were later refitted as C-97G transports and equipped several squadrons of the U.S. Air National Guard.

One YC-97A (45–59595) was used in the Berlin Airlift during April 1949, operating for the 1st Strategic Support Squadron. It suffered a landing gear accident at Gatow and by the time it was repaired, the Soviet Blockade was lifted.

C-97s evacuated casualties during the Korean War. C-97s also participated in the Biafran airlift, delivering relief materials to Uli airstrip in Biafra during the Nigerian Civil War. Flying under the cover of darkness and at treetop level to evade radar, at least two C-97s were lost.

 
Only one C-97 is still airworthy at the present day, (S/N 52-2718, named "Angel of Deliverance") operated by the Berlin Airlift Historical Foundation. It is painted as YC-97A 45–59595, the only C-97 to participate in the Berlin Airlift.

The Israelis turned to Stratocruisers and KC-97s when they could not buy the preferred C-130. They adapted Boeing 377 Stratocruiser airliners into transports, including many using C-97 tail sections including the loading ramps. Others were adapted with swiveling tails and refueling pods. One Israeli C-97 was downed by an Egyptian SA-2 Guideline missile on 17 September 1971, while flying as an electronic counter-measures platform some 12 miles from the Suez Canal.

Variants
XC-97 military designation of the prototype Boeing 367, three built.
YC-97 cargo transport, six built.

YC-97A troop carrier, three built.
YC-97B fitted with 80 airliner-style seats, later redesignated C-97B, in 1954 became C-97D, retired to MASDC 15 December 1969.
C-97A transport, 50 built.
KC-97A Three C-97As were converted into aerial refueling tankers with rear loading door removed and a flight refueling boom added. After the design was proven, they were converted back into the standard C-97A.
C-97C Second production version, 14 built; those used as medical evacuation transports during the Korean War were designated MC-97C. 
VC-97D staff transport and flying command post conversions, three C-97As converted.
C-97E KC-97Es converted to transports.
KC-97E
 aerial refueling tankers with rear loading doors permanently closed; 60 built.
C-97F KC-97Fs converted to transports.
KC-97F
 3800hp R-4360-59B engines and minor changes; 159 built.
C-97G 135 KC-97Gs converted to transports.
EC-97G ELINT conversion of three KC-97Gs. 53–106 was operated by the CIA for covert ELINT operations in the West Berlin Air Corridor.
KC-97G
 dual-role aerial refueling tankers/cargo transportation aircraft. KC-97G models carried underwing fuel tanks; 592 built.
GKC-97G
Five KC-97Gs were used as ground instruction airframes.
JKC-97G
One aircraft was modified to test the underwing General Electric J47-GE-23 jet engines, and was later designated KC-97L.
HC-97G KC-97Gs converted for search and rescue operations; 22 converted.
KC-97H

One KC-97F was experimentally converted into a probe-and-drogue refueling aircraft.
YC-97J KC-97G conversion with four 5,700 hp (4,250 kW) Pratt & Whitney YT34-P-5 turboprops, two converted. Originally designated YC-137. 
C-97K 27 KC-97Gs converted to troop transports. 
KC-97L
81 KC-97Gs modified with two J47 turbojet engines on underwing pylons.

Operators

Military operators
 
Israeli Air Force
 
Spanish Air Force
 
United States Air Force

U.S. Air Force units
The following Air Force wing organizations flew the various C-97 models at some time during their existence:

Air National Guard
105th Aeromedical Transport Group – Westchester County Airport, New York (1962–1969)
137th Air Transport Squadron
106th Air Transport Group – Suffolk County Airport, New York
102d Air Transport Squadron
109th Air Transport Group – Schenectady Airport, New York
139th Air Transport Squadron
111th Air Transport Group – NAS Willow Grove, Pennsylvania
103d Air Transport Squadron
116th Air Transport Group – Dobbins ARB, Georgia
128th Air Transport Squadron (Heavy)
118th Air Transport Group – Berry Field Air National Guard Base / Nashville International Airport, Tennessee
105th Air Transport Squadron
126th Air Refueling Wing – O'Hare Airport, Illinois
 108th Air Refueling Squadron
128th Air Refueling Wing – Gen. Mitchell Airport, Wisconsin
 126th Air Refueling Squadron
133d Air Transport Wing – Minneapolis-St Paul International Airport, Minnesota
109th Air Transport Squadron (Heavy)
137th Air Transport Group – Will Rogers World Airport, Oklahoma
185th Air Transport Squadron
138th Air Transport Group – Tulsa Air National Guard Base / Tulsa International Airport, Oklahoma
125th Air Transport Squadron
139th Air Transport Group – Rosecrans Air National Guard Base, Missouri
180th Air Transport Squadron (Heavy)
146th Air Transport Wing – Van Nuys Air National Guard Base / Van Nuys Airport, California
115th Air Transport Squadron (Heavy)
195th Air Transport Squadron (Heavy)
151st Air Transport Wing – Salt Lake City Air National Guard Base / Salt Lake City International Airport, Utah
191st Air Transport Squadron (Heavy)
157th Air Transport Group – Grenier AFB, New Hampshire(1960–1964)/ Pease AFB, New Hampshire (1964–1968)
133d Air Transport Squadron (Heavy)
161st Air Transport Group – Sky Harbor International Airport, Arizona (1966–1972)
197th Air Transport Squadron
162d Air Transport Wing -, Arizona
164th Air Transport Group – Memphis Air National Guard Base / Memphis International Airport, Tennessee
155th Air Transport Squadron (Heavy)
165th Air Transport Group – Savannah Air National Guard Base / Savannah International Airport, Georgia
158th Air Transport Squadron (Heavy)
166th Air Transport Group – New Castle Air National Guard Base / Greater Wilmington Airport, Delaware
142d Air Transport Squadron

Civil operators
Balair
Berlin Airlift Historical Foundation
Foundation for Airborne Relief (USA)
Hawkins & Powers Aviation
Zantop Air Transport

Accidents and incidents
22 May 1947 USAF XC-97 43-27472 crashed in a wheat field near Wright-Patterson Air Force Base and caught fire, killing five of seven crew on board.
6 June 1951 USAF C-97A 48-0398 crashed near Kelly Air Force Base due to a possible asymmetric flap extension on takeoff, killing all nine crew on board.
15 October 1951 After taking off from Lajes Field, Azores, USAF C-97A 49-2602 of the Military Air Transport Service went missing on a flight from Lajes AFB (LFB), Azores to Westover Air Force Base, Massachusetts. The aircraft was piloted by Captain John Francis Dailey Jr. and had a crew of 11. A total of 50 aircraft and ships searched the intended route but no trace of the aircraft or crew was ever found.
22 October 1951 USAF C-97A 48-0413 crashed and burned next to a runway at Kelly AFB, killing four of six on board.
22 March 1957 USAF C-97C 50-0702 en route to Tokyo went missing over the Pacific Ocean, with 10 crew and 57 passengers on board. It is the deadliest incident ever involving the C-97.
8 August 1957 USAF C-97 en route to Hawaii from US. No.1 engine lost its propeller and damaged No.2 engine. Aircraft flew for 5 hours at 150ft altitude to land at Hilo.
19 January 1958 USAF C-97A 49-2597 en route to Wake Island from Honolulu went missing over the Pacific Ocean with seven crew on board. The navy confirmed that debris found 277 miles to the southwest of Honolulu, was wreckage of the plane.
29 June 1964 USAF HC-97G 52-2773, along with USAF HC-54D 42-72590, were performing pararescue training and photography missions for the NASA Gemini program when the HC-54 banked to the right, colliding with the HC-97 and shearing off the wing and tail section; both aircraft crashed in the water off Bermuda, killing 17 on board both aircraft; seven survived after they jumped before the aircraft collided. The cause was probably incapacitation of the HC-54 pilot.
26 September 1969 A Nordchurchaid C-97G, (N52676), struck trees and crashed while on final approach to Uli Airstrip, killing all five on board.
30 July 1987 After taking off, a C-97G (HI-481) operated by Belize Air International (a cargo airline) crashed onto the Mexico City-Toluca highway after the cargo shifted, killing 5 of 12 on board and 44 on the ground.

Surviving aircraft

Israel
On display
C-97K 035/4X-FPO – Israeli Air Force Museum, Hatzerim Airbase, Beersheba, Israel.

United States
Airworthy
C-97G (converted from KC-97G)
52-2718 "Angel of Deliverance" – Berlin Airlift Historical Foundation of Farmingdale, New Jersey. It is painted as YC-97A 45–59595.
On display
C-97G (all converted from KC-97G)
52-2626 – Pima Air & Space Museum, adjacent to Davis–Monthan Air Force Base in Tucson, Arizona.
52-2764 – Don Q Inn, next to the (now closed) Dodgeville Municipal Airport outside Dodgeville, Wisconsin. It was used for filming commercials.
53-218 – Minnesota Air Guard Museum on the north side of the Minneapolis–Saint Paul International Airport in Minneapolis, Minnesota.  It has been there since November 2003.

Specifications (C-97)

See also

References
Notes

Bibliography

 Archer, Bob. "Database: Boeing C-97". Aeroplane, Vol. 45, No. 5, May 2017. pp. 81–97. .
 Bach, Martin. Boeing 367 Stratofreighter, Boeing 377 Stratocruiser, Aero Spacelines Guppies. Allershausen: NARA Verlag,  1996. . 
 Bowers, Peter M. Boeing Aircraft since 1916. London: Putnam Aeronautical Books, 1989, . 
 Bridgman, Leonard. Jane's All The World's Aircraft 1952–53. London: Sampson Low, Marston & Company, 1952. 
 Rubinstein, Murray and Richard Goldman. The Israeli Air Force Story London: Arms & Armour Press, 1979. .
 Swanborough, Gordon and Peter M Bowers: United States Military Aircraft since 1909. London: Putnam Aeronautical Books, 1989, .

External links

How to Fly the C97
Airliners.net – The Boeing C-97 Stratofreighter
Angel of deliverance: Boeing C-97G sn 52-2718
Goleta Air & Space Museum – Boeing C-97 Stratofreighter/Stratotanker
PhotoValet – Air Force Military Aircraft: Boeing C-97 and KC-97 Stratotanker/Stratofreighter images
Newsreel introducing the C97 showing rear ramps

C-0097
Boeing C-097 Stratofreighter
Four-engined tractor aircraft
Low-wing aircraft
Aircraft with auxiliary jet engines
C-97
Aircraft first flown in 1944
Four-engined piston aircraft